Zopfiella is a genus of fungi within the Lasiosphaeriaceae family.

The genus was circumscribed by Heinrich Georg Winter in Rabenh. Krypt.-Fl. ed.2, vol.1 (2) on page 56 in 1884.

The genus name of Zopfiella is in honour of Friedrich (or Friederich) Wilhelm Zopf (1846–1909), who was a well-known German botanist and mycologist. He dedicated to his whole life with fungal biology, particularly in classification of fungi and dye production in fungi and lichens.

Species
As accepted by Species Fungorum;

Zopfiella attenuata 
Zopfiella cephalothecoidea 
Zopfiella ebriosa 
Zopfiella erostrata 
Zopfiella flammifera 
Zopfiella indica 
Zopfiella inermis 
Zopfiella latipes 
Zopfiella lundqvistii 
Zopfiella neogenica 
Zopfiella ovina 
Zopfiella pleuropora 
Zopfiella submersa 
Zopfiella tabulata 
Zopfiella tardifaciens 
Zopfiella udagawae 

Former species;
 Z. backusii  = Triangularia backusii, Podosporaceae family
 Z. carbonaria  = Jugulospora carbonaria, Neoschizotheciaceae
 Z. curvata  = Diffractella curvata, Sordariales
 Z. karachiensis  = Lundqvistomyces karachiensis, Schizotheciaceae
 Z. leucotricha  = Cladorrhinum leucotrichum, Podosporaceae
 Z. longicaudata  = Triangularia longicaudata, Podosporaceae
 Z. macrospora  = Podospora macrospora, Podosporaceae
 Z. marina  = Pseudorhypophila marina, Naviculisporaceae
 Z. matsushimae  = Triangularia matsushimae, Podosporaceae
 Z. pilifera  = Pseudorhypophila pilifera, Naviculisporaceae
 Z. tanzaniensis  = Lundqvistomyces tanzaniensis, Schizotheciaceae
 Z. tetraspora  = Triangularia tetraspora, Podosporaceae

References

External links

Lasiosphaeriaceae